George Hughes (9 October 1865 – 27 October 1945) was an English locomotive engineer, and chief mechanical engineer (CME) of the Lancashire and Yorkshire Railway (L&YR) and the London, Midland and Scottish Railway (LMS).

Biography
George Hughes was born on 9 October 1865 and served a premium apprenticeship at the London and North Western Railway (LNWR) Crewe Works between 1882 and 1886.

At the L&YR he started in the test room, and Bulleid notes the L&YR's John Aspinall was most pleased with his work there. He progressed through various positions at the L&YR culminating in achieving in becoming chief mechanical engineer in March 1904. 

He introduced the L&YR locomotive classification system around 1919. 

When the L&YR amalgamated into the LNWR in January 1922 he became the CME of the combined group and was appointed the CME of the LMS on its formation at the 1923 grouping.

He retired in July 1925 after only two and a half years at the LMS. He was succeeded by Henry Fowler who had worked with him at Horwich Works before moving to the former Midland Railway's Derby Works.

He died on 27 October 1945.

Steam locomotives

L&YR
 Class 4, a superheated development of the Class 3, there were 2 versions each having different cylinder sizes and valve gear. 
 Class 6, a superheated development of the Class 5
 Class 8 4-6-0 Dreadnought. As initially built these express passenger engines had significant issues, following rebuild their performance was "creditable".
 Class 28, a superheated development of the Class 27
 Railmotors
 2-10-0, a heavy mineral loco design of 1914, not built owing to the outbreak of the Great War.

LMS
 LMS Hughes Crab, a  5P4F mixed-traffic locomotive had the basic design completed before Hughes' retirement. It  was the last design from Horwich Works and Marshall gives it the accolade "The engine became at once, and remained, one of the best on the LMS". 245 were produced and Marshall comments the successful LMS Fowler 2-6-4T was also influenced by the design.
 4-6-4T Dreadnought tank, Designed for L&YR, built by the LMS.

Electric locomotives
During Hughes' time at the Lancashire and Yorkshire Railway built an electric goods locomotive in 1912 and a battery-electric shunter around 1917. The former had four 150 horsepower motors (total 600 hp) and could pick up current from the third rail on the main line or from overhead lines in freight yards.

Publications

See also
 Locomotives of the Lancashire and Yorkshire Railway
 LYR electric units

References

Bibliography

External links
 George Hughes Steam Index website article

1865 births
1945 deaths
English railway mechanical engineers
Locomotive builders and designers
Lancashire and Yorkshire Railway
London, Midland and Scottish Railway people